Caecidae is a taxonomic family of very small and minute sea snails or micromolluscs, marine gastropod molluscs in the order Littorinimorpha.

Habitat
These minute tubular shells can be found living in marine sediment, or among algae or sponges, in warm and temperate seas.

Shell description
The shells in this family, are unusual in that the adult shell is a curving tube. In the subfamily Caecinae the protoconch is lost and the tube is sealed with a permanent calcareous plug at one end. In the subfamilies Ctiloceratinae and Strebloceratinae the protoconch is retained. At the other end the tube is sealed by a circular operculum. The spiral part is almost always lost when outgrowing the juvenile stage. The color of the shell is white to pale yellow.

Taxonomy
This family contains three subfamilies :
 Caecinae Gray, 1850
 Ctiloceratinae Iredale & Laseron, 1957
 Strebloceratinae Bandel, 1996

Genera
 Caecum Fleming, 1813
 Carinocera Iredale & Laseron, 1957
 Ctiloceras R. B. Watson, 1886
 Elephantanellum Bartsch, 1920
 Elephantulum Carpenter, 1856
 Enigmerces Iredale & Laseron, 1957
 Fartulum Carpenter, 1857
 Gladioceras Iredale & Laseron, 1957
 Jayella Iredale & Laseron, 1957
 Mauroceras Vannozzi, 2019
 Meioceras Carpenter, 1859
 Parastrophia de Folin, 1870
 Ponderoceras Bandel, 1996
 Pseudoparastrophia 
 Strebloceras Carpenter 1859
 Torresella Iredale & Laseron, 1957
Transcopia Iredale & Laseron, 1957
 Watsonia de Folin, 1880 (possibly synonymous with Parastrophia)
 Genera brought into synonymy 
 Brochina Gray, 1857: synonym of Caecum Fleming, 1813 
 Brochus T. Brown, 1827: synonym of Caecum Fleming, 1813
 Micranellum Bartsch 1900: synonym of  Caecum Fleming, 1813
 Moreletia de Folin, 1869: synonym of Parastrophia de Folin, 1869
 Odontidium Philippi, 1836: synonym of Caecum Fleming, 1813
 Pedumicra Iredale & Laseron, 1957: synonym of Parastrophia de Folin, 1869
 Phleboceras de Folin, 1868: synonym of Strebloceras Carpenter, 1859
 Pictocaecum Habe 1978: synonym of Caecum Fleming, 1813
 Spirolidium O. G. Costa, 1861: synonym of Parastrophia de Folin, 1869: synonym

References

   Folin L. de (1875) Monographie de la famille des Caecidae. Bulletin de la Société des Sciences, Lettres et Arts de Bayonne, 1: 103-131, 1 pl
 Vaught, K.C. (1989). A classification of the living Mollusca. American Malacologists: Melbourne, FL (USA). . XII, 195 pp
 Bouchet P. & Rocroi J.-P. (2005). Classification and nomenclator of gastropod families. Malacologia 47(1-2): 1-397
 Pizzini M., Raines B. & Vannozzi A. (2013) The family Caecidae in the South-West Pacific (Gastropoda: Rissooidea). Bollettino Malacologico, 49 (suppl. 10): 1-78. 
 WoRMS : Caecidae; accessed : 18 October 2010
 
 Powell A. W. B., New Zealand Mollusca, William Collins Publishers Ltd, Auckland, New Zealand 1979 

 
Taxa named by John Edward Gray